Sikhs form a very small minority in Iran, with a 2011 estimate stating some 60 to 100 families to be residing in Iran. Members of the community speak Punjabi among themselves, and Persian and Balochi with the larger community. Most Sikhs living in Iran are Iranian citizens.

History
The first presence of Sikhs to Iran began in the 1900, when both Sikh business people as well as Sikh troops in the British military during its occupation of Iran. The primary target of Sikh immigration was initially the hamlet of Zahedan, near the border with then British India (now Pakistan) during the 1920s when the Trans-Iranian Railway project was started. According to a  folk etymology it is believed that when Reza Shah visited the city he saw Sikhs in white robes living there and thus changed the name from Dozdab (Land of thieves) to Zahedan (plural of the persian word , meaning 'pious') after the Sikhs who were considered zâhid (Sages) by him.

An Indian school was started in 1930s located in Zahedan serving Sikh families. It was shifted to Tehran in 1952 and became Kendriya Vidyalaya Tehran in 2004.

In 1979 there were around 250 Sikhs in Zahedan who own motor parts distributorships, construction firms and import-export companies. After the Iranian Revolution a number Sikhs left for India and Europe and remaining shifted to the capital city of Tehran.

In 2019 State Government of Punjab, India announced that a chair will be installed in the name of Guru Nanak in 11 universities, of which seven are in Punjab, three in other parts of India and one University of Religions and Denominations in Iran. The Chair will conduct research on life and teachings of Guru Nanak.

See also
 Masjid-e-Hindan
 Buddhism in Iran

References